The Rajya Sabha (meaning the "Council of States") is the upper house of the Parliament of India. Andhra Pradesh elects 11 seats and they are indirectly elected by the state legislators of Andhra Pradesh. After formation of Telangana State in 2014, 7 seats were allotted to Telangana, and 5 seats to Andhra Pradesh. The number of seats, allocated to the party, are determined by the number of seats a party possesses during nomination and the party nominates a member to be voted on. Elections in within the state legislatures are held using Single transferable vote with proportional representation.

Current members
Keys:

JAN/BJP Rajya Sabha members from Andhra Pradesh state

YSRCP Rajya Sabha members from Andhra Pradesh state

TDP Rajya Sabha members from Andhra Pradesh state

INC Rajya Sabha members from Andhra Pradesh state

CPI/CPM Rajya Sabha members from Andhra Pradesh state

OTH/TR/CO Rajya Sabha members from Andhra Pradesh state

References

External links

Rajya Sabha
State wise list

Andhra
 
Andhra Pradesh-related lists

bg:Раджа Сабха
cy:Rajya Sabha
de:Rajya Sabha
fr:Rajya Sabha
gu:રાજ્ય સભા
ko:라자 사바
it:Rajya Sabha
ml:രാജ്യസഭ
mr:राज्यसभा
nl:Rajya Sabha
ja:ラージヤ・サバー
pl:Rajya Sabha
pt:Rajya Sabha
sv:Rajya Sabha
te:రాజ్యసభ
Lists of people from Andhra Pradesh